The Arkanum is the fourth studio album by German melodic death metal band Suidakra.

Track listing 
 Wartunes – 4:51
 To Rest in Silence – 5:34
 Dragonbreed – 3:59
 Rise of Taliesin – 4:50
 Last Fortress – 4:06
 Gates of Nevermore – 4:16
 Serenade to a Dream – 2:39
 The Arcane Spell – 4:51
 The One Piece Puzzle – 5:15 (Skyclad Cover)

Personnel 
 Arkadius Antonik – lead, rhythm, melodic, acoustic guitars,  main vocals
 Marcel Schoenen – melodic, acoustic guitars,  clean vocals
 Nils Bross- bass, Suidakra logo
 Stefan Möller – drums
 Daniela Voigt – Keyboards,  vocals
 Andy Classen – engineering & mastering
 Kris Verwimp – cover art

External links 
 Track list and lyrics on suidakra.com

2000 albums
Suidakra albums